Trevor John Kemp (died 15 October 2012) was a Scottish footballer who played as a midfielder.

Kemp played his junior football for Shielfield Juniors before playing between 1961 and 1964 for Scottish Second Division club Berwick Rangers. In 1965 he played for Australian team Melbourne Hungaria.

References

1940s births
2012 deaths
Scottish footballers
Association football midfielders
Scottish Football League players
Berwick Rangers F.C. players